is a Japanese swimmer. At the 2012 Summer Olympics, he competed in the Men's 100 metre breaststroke, finishing in 7th place in the first semifinal, failing to reach the final.
Tateishi subsequently won a bronze medal in the 200 metre breaststroke.

References

1989 births
Living people
Olympic swimmers of Japan
Swimmers at the 2012 Summer Olympics
Japanese male breaststroke swimmers
Olympic bronze medalists for Japan
Olympic bronze medalists in swimming
Asian Games medalists in swimming
Swimmers at the 2010 Asian Games
Medalists at the 2012 Summer Olympics
Universiade medalists in swimming
Asian Games gold medalists for Japan
Asian Games silver medalists for Japan
Medalists at the 2010 Asian Games
Universiade gold medalists for Japan
Medalists at the 2011 Summer Universiade
21st-century Japanese people